The Elbow River is a river in St. Louis County, Minnesota. It rises south of the Kabetogama State Forest and flows for approximately 9 miles before joining the Pelican River near Glendale.

See also
List of rivers of Minnesota

References

Minnesota Watersheds
USGS Hydrologic Unit Map - State of Minnesota (1974)

Rivers of Minnesota